is a private university in Yotsukaido, Chiba, Japan, established in 1998. The predecessor of the school was founded in 1938. The university also has an attached junior college. The word "Aikoku" means "patriotism" in Japanese.

Alumni 
 Official website 

Educational institutions established in 1938
Private universities and colleges in Japan
Universities and colleges in Chiba Prefecture
1938 establishments in Japan